is a railway station in the town of Tōhoku in Aomori Prefecture, Japan, operated by the third sector railway operator Aoimori Railway Company.

Lines
Kogawara Station is served by the Aoimori Railway Line, and is 53.5 kilometers from the terminus of the line at Aomori Station. It is 670.8 kilometers from Tokyo Station.

Station layout
Kogawara Station has two opposed side platforms serving two tracks connected by a footbridge. There is no station building, but only a small shelter on one of the platforms, and the platforms are not numbered. The station is unattended.

Platforms

History
It was elevated to the status of a full station on June 10, 1953. The station has been unattended since August 1971. With the privatization of the Japan National Railways on April 1, 1987, it came under the operational control of East Japan Railway Company (JR East).

The section of the Tōhoku Main Line including this station was transferred to Aoimori Railway on December 4, 2010.

Surrounding area
Lake Ogawara
Kogawara Post Office

See also
 List of Railway Stations in Japan

References
 JTB Timetable December 2010 issue

External links
Aoimori Railway station information 

Railway stations in Aomori Prefecture
Railway stations in Japan opened in 1953
Tōhoku, Aomori
Aoimori Railway Line